Frank Cedeno (born March 16, 1958) is a British-Filipino former professional boxer in the Flyweight division.

Professional boxing career
Cedeno made his professional debut in 1976, losing to Ray De los Santos via eight round points decision. After 7 years with 38 fights, Cedeno finally got his chance to fight for the world championship. In September 1983, Cedeno knocked out Charlie Magri in the sixth round to claim the WBC and Lineal Flyweight titles.

On January 18, 1984, Cedeno made his first title defence against Koji Kobayashi in Nagoya, Japan and lost via second-round TKO. He retired in 1988 with a record of 43 wins with 23 KOs, 10 losses and 3 draws.

See also
List of flyweight boxing champions
List of WBC world champions

References

External links
 
 Frank Cedeno - CBZ Profile

1958 births
Living people
Filipino male boxers
Flyweight boxers
World boxing champions
People from Talisay, Cebu
Boxers from Cebu